State Highway 57 (SH 57) is a  Texas state highway located in Tyler.

Route description
SH 57 begins at an intersection with  SH 155 in southwestern Tyler. The route travels to the east before ending at  FM 2493. The roadway continues under local maintenance as Grande Boulevard. SH 57 is four lanes with a center turn lane for its entire length.

History

SH 57 was originally designated on August 21, 1923, on a route along the Gulf Coast from Rockport to Gregory, replacing part of SH 12, which was relocated to the west. On March 19, 1928, the route was extended to east of Blessing. On April 25, 1929, a section from Corpus Christi to Chapman Ranch was added. On March 19, 1930, the section from Corpus Christi to Chapman Ranch became part of SH 96. On October 21, 1930, SH 57 was rerouted to end in Palacios. On April 10, 1934, this route was cancelled, as it became part of SH 35.

The SH 57 designation was once again used beginning on August 5, 1966, on a route from Eagle Pass to near Moore, as a renumbering of SH 76 and to coincide with Mexican Federal Highway 57. This route would be renumbered  US 57 on August 31, 1970.

The current SH 57 was designated on February 21, 1994. There are plans for the highway to be extended west to connect with Segment 3 of the under construction  Loop 49.

Major intersections

References

057
Transportation in Smith County, Texas